Malin is a Swedish form of the feminine given name Magdalene. Notable people with the name include:

 Malin Åkerman, Swedish-Canadian actress, model and singer
 Linn Berggren (Malin "Linn" Berggren, born 1970), former lead singer of the Swedish dance/pop band Ace of Base
 Malin Baryard-Johnsson, Swedish show jumper
 Malin Byström, Swedish operatic soprano
 Malin Crépin, Swedish actress
 Malin Larsson (born 1980), Swedish politician
 Malin Matsdotter (1613–1676), alleged Swedish witch, executed by burning at the stake
 Malin Moström (born 1975), Swedish footballer
 Malin Nilsson, Swedish freestyle swimmer
 Malin Reitan, Norwegian child singer

Swedish feminine given names